Mono- and diglycerides of fatty acids (E471) refers to a naturally occurring class of food additive composed of diglycerides and monoglycerides which is used as an emulsifier. It is also used as a fruit coating agent. This mixture is also sometimes referred to as partial glycerides.

Synthesis
Monoglycerides and diglycerides are both naturally present in various seed oils, however their concentration is usually low and industrial production is primarily achieved by a glycerolysis reaction between triglycerides (fats/oils) and glycerol. The raw materials of this may be either vegetable or animal fats and oils.

Concerns for vegan, vegetarian and religious diets
E471 is mainly produced from vegetable oils (such as soybean), although animal fats are sometimes used and cannot be completely excluded as being present in the product. The fatty acids from each source are chemically identical. The Vegan Society, which discourages eating animal-based foods, flags E471 as potentially animal based.

Other uses
In the late 2010s, the company Apeel Sciences entered the market in parts of South America, China, and Japan with monoacylglycerols as an alternative to plastic films to prevent withering and conserving fruit and vegetables for transport and storage.

See also
 Polyglycerol polyricinoleate
 Monoglyceride
 Diglyceride

References

External links
Food-Info.net: E-numbers: E471

Food additives
Fatty acid esters
E-number additives
Glycerol esters